Derrière les murs (known as Behind the Walls in the US) is a French supernatural-thriller film written and directed by Julien Lacombe and Pascal Sid.

Plot
The story is about a young writer, played by Laetitia Casta, who goes to the countryside in order to find inspiration. There, she is haunted by nightmares and depressions while in the area young girls disappear without a trace.

Cast
 Laetitia Casta as Nicole
 Thierry Neuvic as Philippe
 Jacques Bonnaffé as Paul
 Roger Dumas as Father Francis
 Anne Benoît as Catherine Luciac
 Anne Loiret as Yvonne
 Emma Ninucci as Valentine
 Mathilde Tolleron as Joséphine

Production
The Sombrero Films production is the first French live-action adaption shot in 3-D.

Release
The film will premiere in France over Bac Films. The United States theatrical release is set for the first trimester 2011 as Behind the Walls.

Soundtrack
The score was composed by the Belgian composer David Reyes.

References

External links 
 

2010s French-language films
Films set in the 1920s
French supernatural thriller films
2011 3D films
2011 films
2010s supernatural thriller films
2010s French films